The Commodore Hotel is an Art Deco-style former hotel building in Portland, Oregon, United States. It was built in 1925 and designed by Herman Brookman. It was listed on the National Register of Historic Places in 1984.

When the building was added to the National Register, it had already ceased to be used as a hotel and was vacant.  Plans to renovate the building and convert it into apartments were approved by the Portland Development Commission that year.

Gilda's Italian Restaurant opened in the building's ground floor in 2010.

References

External links

1925 establishments in Oregon
Art Deco architecture in Oregon
Art Deco hotels
Goose Hollow, Portland, Oregon
Herman Brookman buildings
Hotel buildings completed in 1925
Hotel buildings on the National Register of Historic Places in Portland, Oregon
Portland Historic Landmarks